The 1981 Big Sky Conference men's basketball tournament was the sixth edition of the tournament, and was held March 6–7 at the Kibbie Dome at the University of Idaho in Moscow, Idaho.

Top-seeded Idaho defeated  in the championship game, 70–64, to clinch their first Big Sky tournament title.

Format
First played in 1976, the Big Sky tournament had the same format for its first eight editions. The regular season champion hosted and only the top four teams from the standings took part, with seeding based on regular season conference records.

No new teams qualified for the Big Sky tournament this year. This was the first year in which three-time defending champion Weber State was not in the title game; the Wildcats tied for fifth and failed to make the field.

Bracket

NCAA tournament
The Vandals  received an automatic bid to the 48-team NCAA tournament, their first appearance, and were seeded seventh in the West region. They lost to Pittsburgh by a point in overtime at El Paso, Texas.

References

Big Sky Conference men's basketball tournament
Tournament
Big Sky Conference men's basketball tournament
Big Sky Conference men's basketball tournament
Basketball competitions in Idaho
College sports tournaments in Idaho
Sports in Moscow, Idaho